Jane Taylor may refer to:

 Jane Taylor (poet) (1783–1824), author of the words for the song "Twinkle, Twinkle, Little Star"
 Jane Taylor (science writer) (c. 1817–1820 — c. 1904–1907), American author of anatomy and physiology textbooks
 Jane Taylor (writer) (born 1956), South African writer and academic
 Jane Taylor (musician) (born 1972), English guitarist, pianist, songwriter and vocalist
 Jane Taylor (lawyer), chair of New Zealand Post
 Jane Taylor (tennis) (born 1972), Australian tennis player